Jackson Center is a borough in eastern Mercer County, Pennsylvania, United States. The population was 192 at the 2020 census. It is part of the Youngstown–Warren metropolitan area.

Geography
Jackson Center is located at  (41.270727, -80.143362).

Demographics

As of the census of 2000, there were 221 people, 81 households and 61 families residing in the borough. The population density was 193.3 per square mile (74.8/km2). There were 85 housing units at an average density of 74.4 per square mile (28.8/km2). The racial makeup of the borough was 100.00% White. Hispanic or Latino of any race were 0.45% of the population.

There were 81 households, of which 39.5% had children under the age of 18 living with them, 54.3% were married couples living together, 11.1% had a female householder with no husband present, and 23.5% were non-families. 18.5% of all households were made up of individuals, and 7.4% had someone living alone who was 65 years of age or older. The average household size was 2.70 and the average family size was 3.05.

In the borough the population was spread out, with 28.5% under the age of 18, 9.0% from 18 to 24, 33.9% from 25 to 44, 17.2% from 45 to 64, and 11.3% who were 65 years of age or older. The median age was 32 years. For every 100 females there were 84.2 males. For every 100 females age 18 and over, there were 92.7 males.

The median income for a household in the borough was $35,625, and the median income for a family was $41,875. Males had a median income of $45,893 versus $25,625 for females. The per capita income for the borough was $15,721. About 7.7% of families and 8.1% of the population were below the poverty line, including 7.9% of those under the age of eighteen and 9.1% of those sixty five or over.

References

Populated places established in 1882
Boroughs in Mercer County, Pennsylvania
1882 establishments in Pennsylvania